Michael Henry may refer to:
 Michael Henry (Alberta politician) (born 1955), former provincial level politician from Alberta, Canada
 Michael Henry (Jamaican politician)
 Michael Danan Henry (born 1939), Buddhist
 Michael Henry (footballer) (born 1986), Montserratian footballer

See also
Mike Henry (disambiguation)